The  Miss Maryland USA competition is the pageant that selects the representative for the state Maryland in the Miss USA pageant. The pageant is directed by D&D Productions.

The first Miss USA winner from Maryland, Mary Leona Gage, won Miss USA 1957. However, she was later discovered to be a mother of two sons and was therefore dethroned. In 2012, Nana Meriwether placed 1st runner-up, but became Miss USA 2012 when Olivia Culpo won Miss Universe 2012.

Six Maryland titleholders are former Miss Maryland Teen USAs.  These four all reigned in the early 1990s, and in fact four out of six titleholders from 1990 to 1995 were former teens.  Only four Miss Maryland USA has competed at Miss America.

From 2006 to 2008, each woman who won Miss Maryland USA was the previous year's first runner-up.

Caleigh Shade of Cumberland was crowned Miss Maryland USA 2022 on May 15, 2022 at Bethesda North Marriott Hotel and Conference Center in Rockville. She represented Maryland for the title of Miss USA 2022.

Gallery of titleholders

Results summary

Miss USA placements
Miss USAs: Mary Leona Gage (1957)
1st runners-up: Paulette Reck (1968), Nana Meriwether (2012)
4th runners-up: Betty Jo Grove (1973), Mamé Adjei (2015)
Top 8/10/12: Carol Theis (1971), Tonja Walker (1980), Linda Lambert (1981), Angie Boyer (1982), Rowann Brewer (1988), Jennifer Wilhoit (1995), Marina Harrison (2005), Allyn Rose (2011), Taylor Burton (2014), Mariela Pepin (2019), Layilah Nasser (2021)
Top 15/20: Barbara Eschenburg (1954), Charlene Holt (1956), Diane White (1959), Royette Tarry (1964), Roselaine Zetter (1966), Sandy Clevering (1967), Kasey Staniszewski (2013), Brittinay Nicolette (2018)

Maryland holds a record of 24 placements at Miss USA.

Awards
Miss Photogenic: Rowann Brewer (1988)
Style Award: Megan Gunning (2001)

Winners
Color key

Notes

References

External links

Maryland
Maryland culture
Women in Maryland
Recurring events established in 1952
1952 establishments in Maryland
Annual events in Maryland